The 2022–23 Scottish League Two (known as cinch League Two for sponsorship reasons) is the tenth season of Scottish League Two, the fourth tier of Scottish football. 

Ten teams contest the league: Albion Rovers, Annan Athletic, Bonnyrigg Rose Athletic, Dumbarton, East Fife, Elgin City, Forfar Athletic, Stenhousemuir, Stirling Albion and Stranraer.

Teams
The following teams changed division after the 2021–22 season.

To League Two
Promoted from Lowland Football League
 Bonnyrigg Rose Athletic

Relegated from League One
 East Fife
 Dumbarton

From League Two
Relegated to Lowland Football League
 Cowdenbeath

Promoted to League One
 Kelty Hearts
 Edinburgh City

Stadia and locations

Personnel and kits

Managerial changes

League summary

League table

Results

Matches 1–18
Teams play each other twice, once at home and once away.

Matches 19–36
Teams play each other twice, once at home and once away.

Season statistics

Scoring

Top scorers

Awards

League Two play-offs
The Pyramid play-off will be contested between the champions of the 2022–23 Highland Football League and the 2022–23 Lowland Football League. The winners will then face the bottom club in the League Two play-off final, being promoted to League Two for the 2023–24 season if they win. If the League Two club loses the play-off, they will be relegated to the Highland or Lowland League for the following season.

Pyramid play-off

First leg

Second leg

Final

First leg

Second leg

References

External links
Official website

Scottish League Two seasons
4
4
Scot
Current association football seasons